Paweł Czychowski (born 19 July 1993) is a Polish professional footballer who plays as a forward for Jaguar Gdańsk.

Senior career

Czychowski began his career with Lechia Gdańsk, playing with the Lechia second team for most of his time at the club, playing over 60 games and scoring 25 goals. In 2013 he joined Puszcza Niepołomice on loan for 6 months, where he played 7 games. He made his Lechia debut against Lech Poznań in 2014, in what turned out to be his only first team appearance for the club. In 2015 Czychowski made a move to Gryf Wejherowo, spending four seasons with the club. In 2019 he moved to GKS Przodkowo.

References

 1993 births
Gryf Wejherowo players
Lechia Gdańsk players
Lechia Gdańsk II players
Polish footballers
Sportspeople from Gdańsk
Sportspeople from Pomeranian Voivodeship
Association football forwards
Living people
Ekstraklasa players
I liga players
II liga players
III liga players
IV liga players